Anna Köhler (also spelled Koehler; born 5 August 1993) is a German bobsledder. She competed in the 2018 Winter Olympics.

References

External links
 
 
 

1993 births
Living people
German female bobsledders
Olympic bobsledders of Germany
Bobsledders at the 2018 Winter Olympics
21st-century German women